Dhamaka may refer to:

 Dhamaka (2020 film), an Indian Malayalam-language comedy film directed by Omar Lulu
 Dhamaka (2021 film), an Indian Hindi-language action thriller written and directed by Ram Madhvani
 Dhamaka (2022 film), an Indian Telugu-language action comedy film written and directed by Trinadha Rao Nakkina
 Dhamaka (restaurant), an Indian restaurant in New York City